Events which happened in Italy in 2002:

2 

2002 in Italian television

8

8th International Architecture Exhibition

C

Cogne homicide

G

2002 Giro d'Italia

I

Italian films of 2002

Incumbents
 President: Carlo Azeglio Ciampi
 Prime Minister: Silvio Berlusconi

L

List of number-one hits of 2002 (Italy)

M

2002 Milan Indoor

2002 Milan–San Remo

2002 Molise earthquake

2002 Italian motorcycle Grand Prix

P

2002 Pirelli Tower plane crash

R

2002 Rome summit

S

2002 San Marino Grand Prix

Serie B 2001–02

Serie B 2002–03

V

59th Venice International Film Festival

W

Italy at the 2002 Winter Olympics

 
Italy
2000s in Italy
Years of the 21st century in Italy
Italy